Alec is the first novel by the playwright William di Canzio, published in 2021. The novel retells and continues the story of E.M. Forster's gay novel Maurice, which was first written between 1913 and 1914, revised throughout Forster's lifetime, and only published after his death in 1971. As the title suggests, Alec is told from the perspective of Alec Scudder, the working-class lover of Maurice'''s titular Maurice. Alexander Chee describes Alec as "the kind of novel Maurice'' could never be, full of sex and war, death and torture."

References 

Novels with gay themes
2021 American novels
2020s LGBT novels
American LGBT novelists
Farrar, Straus and Giroux books